Hildwin v. Florida, 490 U. S. 638 (1972), is a United States Supreme Court case which addresses the sixth amendment to the United States Constitution. It considers if imposition of the death penalty when no specific finding of aggravating factors was made by the jury. In a per curiam decision, the court ruled that there is no need for the jury to present specific findings when imposing the death penalty, as the judge is the one who decides the fact while the jury merely gives recommendations to the judge.

Background 

The petitioner, Paul Hildwin, was convicted of first-degree murder, a capital offense, by the jury. During the sentencing, with only one factor needed to sentence him to death, the judge found four aggravating factors and sentenced him to death. However, the jury did not provide any aggravating factor in their advisory of verdict.

The petitioner then appealed for the court to decide if the Florida capital sentencing scheme is in violation of the 6th amendment to the United States Constitution.

Opinion of the Court 
In a per curiam decision, the court upheld the Supreme Court of Florida's decision and held that there is no right under the sixth amendment to the United States Constitution that required there to be specific findings made by the jury to impose a death penalty.

Dissents 
Both Justice Brennan and Marshall dissented and reiterated their view that the death penalty is cruel and unusual and pointed to their respective dissents in Gregg v. Georgia.

Subsequent events 
This case was overturned in 2016 in the Supreme Court ruling Hurst v. Florida.

The defendant, Paul Hildwin, was released in 2020 after 35 years following DNA testing exonerated him of the crime.

References

External links 

1989 in American law
United States death penalty case law
United States Supreme Court cases of the Rehnquist Court
United States Supreme Court per curiam opinions